The United States competed at the 2012 Winter Youth Olympics in Innsbruck, Austria.

Medalists

Alpine skiing

The United States sent a maximum of two athletes to compete in the alpine skiing event, one male and one female athlete.

Biathlon

The United States qualified two male and two female biathletes.

Individual

Mixed

Bobsleigh

The United States sent a pair of athletes to compete in the two-man bobsled event.

Cross country skiing

The United States qualified one male and one female cross-country skier.

Individual

Notes
LL – Lucky loser; lucky losers in the cross country skiing sprint competitions qualified for the next round by posting the best heat times among the third and fourth placed competitors in that round.

Mixed

Curling

The United States qualified a mixed team of two junior men and two junior women. The team representing the United States was decided at the Youth Olympic Games playdown in Grafton, North Dakota.

Mixed team
Team
Skip: Korey Dropkin
Third: Sarah Anderson
Second: Thomas Howell
Lead: Taylor Anderson

Standings

Round-robin results

Draw 1

Draw 2

Draw 3

Draw 4

Draw 5

Draw 6

Draw 7

Playoffs
Quarterfinals

Final place: 5

Mixed doubles
Teams

Second: 
Lead: 

Second: 
Lead: 

Second: 
Lead: 

Second: 
Lead:

Results

Round of 32

Round of 16

Quarterfinals

Semifinals

Bronze Medal Game

Figure skating

The United States qualified a total of three singles skaters and three skating pairs. However, there were only one athlete in girls' singles, one pair team in pair skating, and two pairs teams in ice dancing. Originally, the United States had received a quota spot in the boys' singles competition and an additional quota spot in the girls' singles competition, but U.S. Figure Skating announced that those spots will not be filled.

Individual/Pairs

Mixed NOC

Freestyle skiing

The United States has qualified two male and two female skiers, one each in the half-pipe and ski cross categories for each gender.

Half-pipe

Ski cross

Ice hockey

The United States sent one boys' ice hockey team consisting of 17 athletes.

Team
The team roster is listed as follows:

Coaching staff
Head Coach: Ben Smith
Athletic Trainer: Stan Wong

Results

Preliminary round

Playoffs

Semifinals

Bronze medal game

Final rank: 4

Luge

The United States qualified three male and two female lugers.

Nordic combined

The United States qualified one athlete in Nordic combined.

Short track speed skating

The United States qualified one male and one female short track speed skater.

Individual

Mixed

Notes
Warren was relegated to the B final after the semifinal, and placed first in the B final. She finished fourth overall.
Warren qualified for the C final after the semifinal, and placed fourth in the C final. She finished eleventh overall.

Skeleton

The United States qualified one male and two female athletes in the skeleton event.

Ski jumping

The United States qualified one male and one female athlete in the ski jumping event.

Individual

Ski Jumping/Nordic combined Mixed team

Snowboarding

The United States qualified one male and one female snowboarder each in the men's and women's half-pipe and slopestyle competitions.

Speed skating

The United States qualified one female speed skater.

See also
United States at the 2012 Summer Olympics

References

2012 in American sports
Nations at the 2012 Winter Youth Olympics
United States at the Youth Olympics